Gangaa (also known as Sagar Ki Gangaa) is an Indian, Hindi-language, television soap opera that premiered on 2 March 2015 on &TV. The show ended on 2 June 2017 after 595 episodes. The show was produced by Sphere Origins and initially starred child actors Swar Hingonia as child Sagar, Ruhana Khanna as child Gangaa and Rajsingh verma  as Gangaa's father.(Bappa) When Gangaa and Sagar grew up, the child actors were replaced with Aditi Sharma and Vishal Vashishtha.

On 29 August 2016, on Janmashtami, Ruhana Khanna, who played child Gangaa, made her comeback as Gangaa and Sagar's daughter Krishna, eight months after being replaced by Aditi Sharma as grown up Gangaa.

On January 16, 2017, the show was revamped; the storyline and the entire cast including lead Vishal Vashishtha, who played the grown up Sagar, except Aditi Sharma who continued to play the role of Gangaa, changed. Shakti Anand was the new lead as Shiv opposite Sharma. The other actors left the show. In October 2018 the show aired on Zee World

Episodes

Season 1

Gangaa Shukla is a 7-year-old, sweet child who lives with her father, Varun Shukla. Varun fixes her marriage, but Gangaa is left alone as both Varun and her husband are killed in Varanasi. Gangaa is forced to live as a widow. Advocate Niranjan Chaturvedi, rescues Gangaa and adopts her. Soon, Gangaa is accepted by family including Niranjan's wife, Madhvi and two sons, Pulkit and Sagar except Niranjan's mother, Kanta who treats her like a widowed servant.

Eventually, Gangaa and Sagar become good friends. They compete in ingenuity, sometimes even in conflict, to unmask the low blows of certain. However, Sagar is revealed to have a hole in his heart. He had to apply vermilion on Gangaa's forehead. After Sagar's recovery, Madhvi and Kanta plan to take Sagar to London to pursue his studies, thinking Sagar would be away from them because of Gangaa. Hence, Sagar and Gangaa are separated.

Season 2

10 years later

Gangaa is now grown up and happens to be in love with Sagar.  She has been putting on her vermilion for 10 years not only to protect him, but also to respect her spouse status.  Madhvi, Sagar's mother fails in her mission to separate her from her son when they finally meet.  It turns out that Sagar came back from London with Janvi, his girlfriend and Sahil, Janvi's brother.

Gangaa doesn't like Janvi and Sahil's company.  Her hopes are shattered upon learning about the relationship between Sagar and Jaanvi as well as the unrequited feelings there are between her and Sagar.
  
But gradually, Sagar cares and supports Gangaa. Finally, he understand that he falls in love of her and expresses his love by applying vermilion on Gangaa in front of the family. As Chaturvedis' object this, Sagar and Gangaa want leave for Delhi for a court marriage. But a misunderstanding causes their immediate separation as Sagar marries Jaanvi on a whim.

Seeing the mistreatment Jaanvi is getting from Sagar for not loving her, Yash, Sagar's cousin, regularly supplies her with drugs and urges her to commit suicide.  Meanwhile, Gangaa gets her life back together and becomes the assistant of a lawyer called Palash.  Sagar who is jealous of her, doesn't hesitate to show it as he neglects his wife more and more.

A few moments later, Sagar is accused for Janvi's death. Gangaa manages to prove him innocent and Yash, the guilty, is later arrested at the same time as Palash as it turns out his love for Gangaa made him possessive to the point of hiding evidence on Sagar's case which he was handling hoping to keep him in  jail. Eventually, Gangaa and Sagar's marriage is fixed after a small altercation with charlatans..

Prabha, Yash's mother, seeks revenge on Gangaa since she was not only taken away from her son but her own husband was pronounced dead presumably due to recent events that would have led to his suicide.  As conspiracy, she gives drink to Sagar a spiked drink and becomes very close to Gangaa. He fails to remember what happened between him and Gangaa. On wedding day, Gangaa is revealed to be pregnant and Sagar questions Gangaa's character. Gangaa is shattered and leaves the house. She joins with Rahat, who takes care of poor, homeless girls. Later, it is believed Rahat and Niranjan were lovers in college. After some twists, Rahat slips to her death. Niranjan takes Rahat's daughter, Zoya to his house. Sagar moves to London with Madhvi believing Niranjan doesn't care about them. Meanwhile, Gangaa gives birth to a daughter, Krishna and decides to move on.

7 years later 
Gangaa is now a lawyer and raises Krishna alone with her friend, Kashish. Krishna is exactly look like child Gangaa. Sagar goes to Banaras on Kanta's insistence. In a jungle, he comes across Krishna and takes care of her. He doubts that Krishna is Gangaa's child because her look. Eventually, Sagar and Gangaa came across each other and Krishna recognizes Sagar as the man who helped her in the jungle.

Krishna is revealed to have a hole in heart like Sagar. Sagar is shocked, and asks Gangaa about Krishna's father. Gangaa refuses to answer him. 
Eventually, Sagar and Chaturvedis' are shocked on learning Krishna is Sagar's daughter. Sagar apologizes from Gangaa, who refused. Sagar sends custody papers and wins Krishna's custody. Pulkit tries to have relationship with Kashish. On family insistence, Pulkit and Surpiya adopt a girl named Juwi.

Eventually, Gangaa and Sagar are reunited. Later, the family meets with a boat accident resulting Krishna and Niranjan to die. Gangaa goes missing and loses her memory.

Season 3

Gangaa is rescued by Shiv Jha, who was marrying a girl named Gangaa. Shiv mistakes Sagar's Gangaa as his wife. Sagar tries to find Gangaa but fails. Gangaa is welcomed to Shiv's house as his bride. She takes care of Shiv's daughter, Radhika as her own while Sagar manages to find Gangaa. Gangaa regains her memory. Shiv is shocked to finding Gangaa's truth and returns her to Sagar. However, Sagar is shot to death, making Shiv to promise that take care of Gangaa.

Gangaa and Shiv are ordered to stay together for a month. Gangaa is broken on learning Krishna's death. Eventually, Gangaa-Radhika closeness brings Shiv and Gangaa together. After some twists, Gangaa and Shiv confess their feelings and get married. Finally, Gangaa opens a primary school, Sagar Vidhyalaya in memory of Sagar.

Cast

Main
 Aditi Sharma as Gangaa Varun Shukla/ Gangaa Sagar Chaturvedi/ Gangaa Shiv Jha – Varun's daughter; Niranjan and Madhvi's adopted daughter; Sagar's widow; Shiv's wife; Krishna's mother; Radhika's step-mother (2015–2017)
 Vishal Vashishtha as Advocate Sagar Chaturvedi – Niranjan and Madhvi's younger son; Pulkit's little brother; Gangaa's late husband; Krishna's father (2015–2017) (Dead)
 Swar Hingonia as Teenage Sagar Chaturvedi (2015)
 Hiten Tejwani as Judge Niranjan "Niru" Chaturvedi – Kanta's son; Madhvi's husband; Pulkit and Sagar's father; Gangaa's adopted father; Krishna's grandfather (2015–2017) (Dead)
 Ruhana Khanna as
 Krishna Chathurvedi – Gangaa and Sagar's daughter (2016–2017) (Dead)
 Child Gangaa Shukla (2015)
 Shakti Anand as Shiv Jha – Savitri's step-son; Pratap and Riya's brother; Gangaa's second husband; Radhika's father (2017)
 Gungun Uprari as Madhvi Chaturvedi – Ratan's sister; Niranjan's wife; Pulkit and Sagar's mother; Gangaa's adopted mother; Krishna's grandmother (2015–2017)
 Sushmita Mukherjee as Kanta "Ammaji" Chaturvedi – Niranjan's mother; Sagar and Pulkit's grandmother; Gangaa's adopted grandmother; Krishna's great-grandmother (2015–2017)
 Abhishek Tiwari as Pulkit Chaturvedi – Niranjan and Madhvi's elder son; Sagar's brother; Supriya's husband; Juwi's adopted father (2015–2017)
 Vedant Sawant as Teenage Pulkit Chaturvedi (2015)

Recurring
 Nivedita Tiwari / Roop Durgapal as Supriya Chaturvedi – Pulkit's wife; Juwi's adopted mother (2015–2017)
 Panchi Bora as Janvi Bhabhi – Sagar's ex-fiancée (2015–2016) (Dead)
 Arishfa Khan as Radhika Jha – Shiv and Parvati's daughter; Gangaa's step-daughter (2017)
 Utkarsha Naik as Savitri Jha – Shiv, Pratap and Riya's step-mother (2017)
 Pankaj Berry as Mr. Jha – Shiv, Pratap and Riya's father; Radhika's grandfather (2017)
 Kishwer Merchant as Asha (2017)
 Amardeep Garg as Karoli Baba (2016)
 Dinesh Mehta as Pratap Jha – Shiv and Riya's brother; Jhumki's husband (2017)
 Anokhi Anand as Jhumki Jha – Pratap's wife (2017)
 Anushka Singh as Riya Jha – Shiv and Pratap's sister (2017)
 Shagun Sharma as Ashi Jha (2017)
 Emir Shah as Prakash (2017)
 Rajesh Balwani as Kushal – Riya's husband (2017)
 Puja Sharma as Kashish Mirza – Gangaa's friend (2016–2017)
 Akash Gill as Yash – Ratan and Prabha's son; Janvi's murderer (2015–2017) (Dead) 
 Rakhee Tandon as Prabha – Ratan's wife; Yash's mother (2015–2017) (Dead) 
 Romanch Mehta as Ratan – Madhvi's little brother; Yash's father; Prabha's husband; Yash's father (2015–2016) (Dead)
 Sunil Jaitley as Maharaj Ji (2015–2017)
 Jaya Bhattacharya as Sudha Bua (2015–2016)
 Gaurav Khanna as Dr. Sameer Mirza – Zoya's father; Rahat's husband (2016) 
 Nausheen Ali Sardar as Rahat Mirza – Niranjan's first love; Zoya's mother; Sameer's wife (2016) (Dead)
 Rucha Gujarathi as Zoya Mirza – Sameer and Rahat's daughter (2016)
 Gaurav Deshmukh as Sahil Bora – Janvi's brother (2015–2016)
 Sarwar Ahuja as Advocate Palash Banerjee - Gangaa's boss while her internship (2016)
 Rohini Kapoor / Rizwana Shaikh as Mehri – The Chaturvedi's maid (2015–2016)
 Mohit Abrol / Deepak Wadhwa as Rudra (2016)
 Raj Singh Verma as Varun Shukla – Gangaa's father (2015) (Dead)
 Divyangana Jain as Ragini (2016)
 Ahsaas Channa as Teenage Saloni – Monsieur's daughter (2015)
 Suman Shashi Kant as Monsieur Srivastav – Chief Minister; Saloni's father (2015)
 Pooja Sethi as Drishti (2015)
 Divyangana Jain as Ragini (2016)
 Sanjay Gandhi as Omkar (2015)
 Priya Wal / Gunjan Vijaya as Barkha – Madhvi's cousin sister (2015) (Dead)
 Sameer Sharma as Raj (2015)
 Pooran Kiri as Verma ji
 Jasveer Kaur as Shreya Mathur (2015)
 Samridh Bawa as Bal Mahant Gautam (2015)
 Mukul Nag as Mr. Chaturvedi – Kanta's husband; Niranjan's father; Sagar and Pulkit's grandfather (2015) (Dead)
 Amita Khopkar as Shanta Devi – Kanta's sister (2015)
 Pavitra Punia as Karuna
 Ratan Rajput as Santoshi from Santoshi Maa (Cameo)
 Sunil Jetly as Maharaji (chef)

Special appearances
Sriti Jha as Pragya Arora Mehra
Shabir Ahluwalia as Abhishek Mehra
Sonali Nikam as Suman
Abhishek Malik as Ranveer
Yukti Kapoor as Ragini
Ratan Rajput as Santoshi
Samiksha Jaiswal as Mehak
Karan Vohra as Shaurya

References

External links
 
Official Website  
Official Streaming Link 
Gangaa Daily Updates

&TV original programming
2015 Indian television series debuts
2017 Indian television series endings
Hindi-language television shows
Indian drama television series
Indian romance television series
Indian television soap operas
Television shows set in Uttar Pradesh